Nakshi Kanthar Math is a dramatized Bengali verse narrative written by poet Jasimuddin published in 1928. The verse is considered a masterpiece in Bengali language and has been translated into many different languages. The poem was translated later by Mary Milford as "The Field of the Embroidered Quilt".

Plot
The verse is a tragic folk tale written in simple language and centers around Rupai and Saju. Rupai is a young peasant Rupa, who falls in love with a girl named Saju in his neighboring village. They are married. But after a quarrel and fight with some peasants of another village Rupai leaves home and flees far away. Saju, the young wife becomes alone. She waits every day with expectant that her husband will return to her, but nothing happens. She becomes tired, all her hope becomes falls. Many days pass and Saju begins to prepare a Nakshi Kantha (an embroidered quilt). In that Nakshi Kantha she types (writes) all the (sad) incidents and tragedies. More days pass and Rupa does not return. Finally Saju dies. Before her death she requests her mother to put the Nakshi Kantha on her grave. Her mother does accordingly. And since then the name of the field becomes Nakshi Kanthar Math. 

Some days after Saju's death, villagers find a young man is lying dead on the grave of Saju and that Nakshi Kantha is in his hands. Villagers identify that man as Rupa.

Popular Media

The hero of the book of the Nakshi Kanthar Math silver embroidered on the popular magazine show, etc. are shown in a report.  In addition, the organization has served in a variety of different cultural dance drama. Ustad Khadim Hussain Khan Nokshi Kanthar Math of music-drama directed by Iran, Iraq, and visited Pakistan. is based on the book of poems, Telefilm Nakshi Kanthar Math. It was directed by Razib Hassan Chanchal Chowdhury and the two played and Farhana Mili.

Critical reviews

The play has been considered as one of the best tragic romantic poems written in Bengali. The poem has been adapted into plays, dance dramas multiple times and appreciated by many. Jasimuddin's good use of language and skill is highlighted in this verse narrative.

References

External links
Official site on Jasimuddin

Bengali-language literature
Bangladeshi poetry books
Bengali poetry